Wuhan Polytechnic University is a university in Wuhan, China. It is located in the Evergreen Garden (Chang Qing Hua Yuan) real estate development north of Hankou, near Tianhe Airport.

WHPU is a multidisciplinary comprehensive university that focuses on food science and engineering. It has about 16,000 full-time students. The university develops agricultural products for processing and transformation.

References

Universities and colleges in Wuhan